The 13th Asian Film Awards are the 2019 edition of the Asian Film Awards. The ceremony was held on March 17, 2019, at the TVB City in Hong Kong.

Winners and nominees
Winners are listed first and highlighted in bold.

References

External links

Asian Film Awards ceremonies
2019 film awards
Film
2019 in Hong Kong
March 2019 events in China